Konstantin Feodosyevich Shteppa, also Step(p)a (3 December 1896, Lokhvytsia, Poltava Governorate — 19 November 1958, New York City) was a Soviet and American historian of German-Ukrainian descent. He studied history of the Byzantine Empire, the Orthodox Church, late medieval history of Ukraine and the history of Stalin's purge. Originally an NKVD informant, he switched allegiance to the SD, the intelligence agency of the SS and the Gestapo, during World War II. He immigrated to the US after the war, where he worked taught and for Radio Free Europe/Radio Liberty.

Early years in Ukraine 
Shteppa was born into the family of an Orthodox priest of German descent in Ukraine. He studied at the Poltava Theological Seminary (1910-1914) and at the Faculty of History and Philology of St. Petersburg University under Professor Mykhailo Rostovtsev.

During the civil war, he was a White Army officer. He was arrested in 1919, seriously wounded in 1920, and taken prisoner during the retreat of Wrangel's army near Perekop.

Academic career 
After the war, he completed his education at the Nizhyn Institute of Public Education at the Faculty of History and Philology, the course of Professor Ivan Turtsevich. Shteppa was able to conceal his anti-Soviet past and became a prominent Soviet historian, head of the Chair of Antiquity and the Middle Age in Kyiv University, later dean of the historical faculty in the same university, and deputy of the Kyiv city council. He co-authored with Oleksander Ohloblyn several propaganda articles against "Russian imperial chauvinism and local nationalism".

From 1927 to 1938 he was an NKVD informant. In February 1938 he was arrested for his alleged anti-Soviet sentiments. While he was in prison, his baby daughter died of hunger. In 1939 he was released without explanation and restored to his professor position in the University; Ukrainian historians accuse him of continued cooperation with NKVD.

Collaboration with the Nazis 
During the German occupation he shortly worked as head of the education department in the city administration and head of Kyiv University (which was dissolved soon afterwards). He came into conflict with the mayor of Kyiv, Volodymyr Bahaziy, and his supporters, a group of pro-Melnyk Ukrainian nationalists, which resulted in their arrest and execution, as well as suppression of the city newspaper "The Ukrainian Word". As a result, Shteppa was appointed editor-in-chief of the newly created newspaper "The New Ukrainian Word" (which, unlike its predecessor, was published in Russian). The newspaper took an openly pro-German stance and criticized the "nationalist" policy of the previous city administration.

At the end of the war Shteppa worked in the mass media of General Andrei Vlasov's movement. His son Erasm was conscripted by the Wehrmacht in 1944, was captured by the Soviets, and spent 20 years in prison before he was able to emigrate to Germany.

Postwar activities in the West 
Shortly after the war he met Fritz Houtermans, a renowned physicist who had been his cellmate in 1938. The latter provided him and his family permits to stay in Germany. Later they co-authored a book "Russian Purge and the Extraction of Confession", which was published under the pseudonyms of Beck and Godin in order to protect their many friends and colleagues back in the USSR.

Shteppa briefly worked as librarian for Clemens August Graf von Galen after his arrival in Germany. In 1947-1949 he actively collaborated in the magazines "Posev" and "Grani".

In the early 1950s Shteppa himself managed to emigrate with the rest of his family to the US, where he worked for the CIA, taught Russian language and literature at the American Army School (1950-1952), published articles and books on Soviet and Russian history, and worked as a columnist for Radio Svoboda. Along with such scientists as Abdurakhman Avtorkhanov, V. O. Yakovlev (B. Troitskyi), O. P. Filipov, K. G. Krypton, and V. P. Marchenko, he was one of the co-founders and employees of the "Institute for the Study of the History and Culture of the USSR" in Munich (1950).

His role in persecution of Ukrainian nationalists in Kyiv under the German occupation was, however, never forgotten nor forgiven by them. Oleksander Ohloblyn ignored Shteppa in his publications on the modern Ukrainian historiography.

Shteppa died in 1958 at Queens Memorial Hospital in Queens, New York City. Shteppa's daughter Aglaia Gorman published a book of reminiscences about the family's history.

References

Bibliography 

 A. Gorman. A Choice Between Two Evils: My Family’s Story of Tragedy And Survival Xlibris Corp, 2006. 
 (In Ukrainian) I. В. Верба. Кость Штеппа (на укр. языке) // Український історичний журнал. 1999. № 3
 (In Ukrainian)  I. В. Верба. Кость Штеппа (окончание, на укр. языке) // Український історичний журнал. 1999. № 3
 (In Russian) XX век — История одной семьи / Под ред. А. В. Попова. М., 2003. (Материалы к истории русской политической эмиграции. Вып. 7)
 (in Ukrainian) I. В. Верба, М. О. Самофалов. Iсторик Кость Штеппа: людина, вчений, педагог. Київ, 2010. 

1896 births
1958 deaths
People from Lokhvytsia
People from Poltava Governorate
People from the Russian Empire of German descent
20th-century Ukrainian historians

Ukrainian SSR emigrants to the United States
20th-century American historians
American male non-fiction writers
Ukrainian anti-communists
Ukrainian collaborators with Nazi Germany
Rectors of Taras Shevchenko National University of Kyiv
20th-century American male writers